Toberín is a simple station, part of the TransMilenio mass-transit system of Bogotá, Colombia.

Location
The station is located in northern Bogotá, specifically on Autopista Norte with calle 165.

It serves the Toberín, Britalia and Granada Norte neighborhoods.

History
After the opening of the Portal de Usme in early 2001, the Autopista Norte line was opened. This station was added as a northerly expansion of that line, which was completed with the opening of the Portal del Norte later that year.

The station is named Toberín due to its proximity to the neighborhood of the same name, located in the locality of Usaquén.

Station services

Old trunk services

Main line service

Feeder routes
This station does not have connections to feeder routes.

Inter-city service
This station does not have inter-city service.

See also
 Bogotá
 TransMilenio
 List of TransMilenio Stations

External links
 TransMilenio

TransMilenio